WSWV may refer to:

 WSWV-FM, a radio station (105.5 FM) licensed to serve Pennington Gap, Virginia, United States
 WHNQ, a radio station (1570 AM) licensed to serve Pennington Gap, Virginia, which held the call sign WSWV from 1958 to 2022